= Mandi Bhalwal =

Coordinates: 32°59′N 73°54′E

Mandi Bhalwal is a village and union council in Azad Kashmir, a territory administered by Pakistan. It is considered the last union council of Pakistan.

According to the 1998 census, the population of the Mandi Bhalwal union council was 18,960. Major villages within the union council include:

- Mandi Bhalwal
- Gurrah Burj
- Moja
- Thill
- Dhok Nakka

The civil hospital is located in Mandi Bhalwal, while the higher secondary school is located in the village of Thill. The union council office is situated in the village of Dehri, near Shakrila town.

Mandi Bhalwal is the largest village in the union council, with the majority of its population belonging to the Chib Rajput community. Educational facilities include a government girls’ middle school, founded by former president Chaudhary Fazal Elahi, and the Captain Addalat Khan Memorial Model School, a co-educational institution established by Asim Hussain in 1998.
